George Bishop (1902-1972) was an Australian professional rugby league footballer who played in the 1920s and 1930s. He played for Balmain and later became a well known referee in the New South Wales Rugby Football League (NSWRFL) competition.

Playing career
Bishop initially came from Goulburn and made his first grade debut for Balmain against rivals Glebe in Round 16, 1923 at Birchgrove Oval. Bishop then departed Balmain and signed with Parkes in the country competition. The following season, Balmain won the premiership after defeating South Sydney 3–0 in the final.

After three seasons with Parkes, Bishop returned to Balmain. Bishop finished as Balmain's top tryscorer on his first season back with the club.

In the same year, Bishop earned his first representative honour as he was selected to play for Metropolis and New South Wales. In 1929, Bishop was selected to play for Australia on the Kangaroo Tour and participated in test matches against Great Britain.

Over the coming years, Bishop would be continue to be selected at representative level but premiership success would elude him with Balmain only reaching the finals once in his entire playing career. Towards the end of his career in 1933, Bishop was selected for a second Kangaroo Tour but was ruled out due to injury.

Refereeing career
In 1937, Bishop was graded as a referee. In 1939, Bishop was the referee as his old club Balmain defeated South Sydney in the grand final. Bishop then went on the referee in two other grand finals featuring Balmain in 1946 and 1948. The following year, Bishop was the referee in the 1949 NSWRFL grand final between St George and South Sydney.

When Western Suburbs met South Sydney in the 1952 NSWRFL decider, Bishop was selected as the referee in what would turn out to be his last match as an official. The match was remembered for much controversy, including South Sydney claims that Western Suburbs scored two tries off forward passes and that South Sydney had two fair tries disallowed.

Wests went on to win the premiership and Bishop stood down as a referee after the game ended. In the aftermath, Souths captain reportedly never spoke to Bishop again despite both of them living in the same suburb for many years. In total, Bishop refereed 223 first grade matches from 1938 to 1952.

In 1955, Bishop became part of the national selection panel who selected the Australian team. Bishop was later sacked from the panel after he was accused of leaking information that Harry Wells had been dropped from Australia's Third Test team against France.

References

1902 births
1972 deaths
Balmain Tigers players
New South Wales rugby league team players
Australian rugby league players
City New South Wales rugby league team players
Rugby league locks
Rugby league second-rows
Rugby league hookers
Australian rugby league referees
Rugby league players from Goulburn, New South Wales
Australia national rugby league team players